Angela Roy (born Angela Giesen; 24 June 1957) is a German actress and director.

Life and career 
Angela Roy was born into a family of artistes. Her parents were acrobats who with a third partner made up the Iris Roy Trio. Up to the age of eleven she was constantly travelling. She learnt various European languages and she now speaks English, French, Italian and Spanish today.

Roy graduated from high school in Hamburg and then she studied ballet, singing and choreography. She graduated from the Royal Academy of Dramatic Art in London. She also has a degree as a certified translator for English / German. She was a choreographer for Pia Zadora.

Roy worked in London theatres and then at the Bavarian State Theatre, the Münchner Volkstheater and at the Hamburger Kammerspiele. In 1998, she and her partner Erich Hallhuber created the play Play it again Brecht at Munich Cuvilliés Theatre. This was their first joint directorial work. Her television career began with roles in the series Zwei Brüder and Aus heiterem Himmel. In 2004 she won the German Television Awards, Television Movie  by Dominik Graf. From November 2006 to October 2007 she starred in the telenovela Rote Rosen as Petra Jansen.

She has a daughter and lives in her hometown of Hamburg (Rotherbaum district) since 2002. She is a member of the German Film Academy and the German Association of film and television actors.

Filmography

Television 

 1989: Drei Damen vom Grill – 7 episodes (Klavierlehrerin)
 1992: Unser Lehrer Doktor Specht
 1992: Regina auf den Stufen – 1 episode
 1993: Liebe ist Privatsache – 15 episodes
 1994–2000: Zwei Brüder (Serie)
 1996: Aus heiterem Himmel – 5 episodes
 2001: Das Traumschiff – Jubiläums-Special
 2001: Der letzte Zeuge – Die Entführung
 2001: Wilsberg und die Tote im Feld
 2002: Doppelter Einsatz
 2002: Tatort – Schatten
 2003: Tatort – Leyla
 2003–2005: Mit Herz und Handschellen (TV series)
 2003: Rosamunde Pilcher – Flamme der Liebe
 2004: 
 2004: Der Ferienarzt ... auf Korfu
 2004: Rose unter Dornen (TV film)
 2004: SK Kölsch – Der letzte der Hippies
 2004: Das Zimmermädchen und der Millionär
 2005: Girlfriends – Süßes und Saures
 2005: Großstadtrevier – Rampensau
 2005: SOKO Kitzbühel - Mord im Schloss
 2005: Bis in die Spitzen – 3 episodes
 2006: Die Rosenheim-Cops - Diebstahl als Alibi
 2006: Ein Fall für zwei – Blutige Liebesgrüße
 2006: Der Kriminalist – Mördergroupie
 2006: Tatort - Liebe am Nachmittag
 2006–2007: Rote Rosen
 2007: Ein unverbesserlicher Dickkopf
 2007: Reife Leistung!
 2008: Geld.Macht.Liebe – episodes 1–12
 2008: Das Traumschiff – Papua Neuguinea
 2009: Geld.Macht.Liebe – episodes 13–19
 2010: SOKO Wismar – Eine kleine Sehnsucht
 2010: Wilde Wellen
 2010: The Gold Quest: A Journey to Panama
 2011: Das Traumhotel – Malediven
 2011: In aller Freundschaft – Gratwanderung
 2011: Weihnachten … ohne mich, mein Schatz!
 2012: Rosamunde Pilcher – Das Geheimnis der weißen Taube
 2012: Inga Lindström: Die Sache mit der Liebe
 2013: Alles Chefsache! (als Carla Monterosso)
 2013: Um Himmels Willen
 2013: Harry nervt
 2014: In aller Freundschaft - Gebrochene Herzen
 2015: Das Traumschiff - Kanada
 2015: Rosamunde Pilcher – Ghostwriter

Film 
 1991: L’Ange déchu
 1996: Für immer und immer (Regie: Hark Bohm)
 2000: Rillenfieber (Regie: Patrick Tauss)
 2004: Die Unsichtbare (Kurzfilm)
 2004: Maria an Callas
 2005: Carrick Mor (Kurzfilm)

Theater 
 Stadttheater Pforzheim
 Festspiele Heppenheim
 Van Brough Theatre, London
 Theater des Westens, Berlin
 Komödie am Kurfürstendamm, Berlin
 Münchner Lach- und Schießgesellschaft
 Münchner Volkstheater
 Bayerisches Staatsschauspiel, München
 Hamburger Kammerspiele

Theater-Programme 
 1997–2002: Ragout Fin de Siècle – Ein Erich-Kästner-Abend für Erwachsene
 2000: Wenn ich mich in Deine Stimme hülle – Ein Lotte Lenya / Kurt Weill Abend
 2001: Ich gehöre nur mir ganz allein – Ein Marlene Dietrich Abend
 2009: Barfuß im Regen – Theater an der Kö
 2012: Die Harry Belafonte Story – Theatertournee

References 
 Neben den unter Weblinks genannten: Harte Arbeit für leichte Kost. Interview in: verde (Kundenmagazin der Drogeriemarktkette Budnikowsky, Hrsg: Iwan Budnikowsky GmbH & Co. KG, Hamburg, Juni 2007, S. 6f).

External links 
 
 Angela Roy bei filmportal.de
 
 Offizielle Webseite
 Kurzbiographie (Stand: 9. Juni 2003)
 Geld.Macht.Liebe

1957 births
German actresses
German theatre directors
Living people
Actresses from Hamburg